Interleukin 24 (IL-24) is a protein in the interleukin family, a type of cytokine signaling molecule in the immune system. In humans, this protein is encoded by the IL24 gene.

IL-24 is a cytokine belonging to the IL-10 family of cytokines that signals through two heterodimeric receptors: IL-20R1/IL-20R2 and IL-22R1/IL-20R2. This interleukin is also known as melanoma differentiation-associated 7 (mda-7) due to its discovery as a tumour suppressing protein.  IL-24 appears to control cell survival and proliferation by inducing rapid activation of particular transcription factors called STAT1 and STAT3. This cytokine is predominantly released by activated monocytes, macrophages and T helper 2 (Th2) cells and acts on skin, lung, and reproductive tissues. IL-24 performs important roles in wound healing, arthritis, psoriasis and cancer. Several studies have shown that cell death occurs in cancer cells/cell lines following exposure to IL-24. The gene for IL-24 is located on chromosome 1 in humans.

Structure 
The structure of IL-24 has been found through crystallization by fusing a flexible linker with a ligand to its two receptors, IL-22R1 and IL-20R2. The structure revealed that there is a lack of disulfides, which is present in most cytokines, and is likely the reason why IL-24 is  unstable compared to other interleukins.

IL-24 is a secreted protein that is highly conserved throughout evolution with sequence homology between species including yeast, dog, cat, monkey and cow. It is located on chromosome 1q32-33 in humans along with several other IL-10 cytokine family gene members. IL-24 encompasses seven exons and six introns. The cDNA of IL-24 is 1,718 base pairs in length and encodes a protein of 206 amino acid with a predicted molecular size of ˜24 kDa. IL-24 also contains an IL-10 signature motif at amino acids 101–121 shared by other IL-10 family member cytokines. IL-24 possibly can form functionally active dimers due to the presence of potential disulfide bonds. Researchers identified a number of splice variants of IL-24 lacking one or more exons. The signal peptide in IL-24 is two times the length as in other related human cytokines (51 amino acids), and the predicted molecular mass of IL-24 monomer is 18.3 kDa.

Function 
IL-24 functions as a cytokine (at low concentrations). Its normal physiological role is connected with wound healing (In normal skin cells, it suppress keratinocyte proliferation during wound healing), protection against diseases caused by bacteria (for example Mycobacterim tuberculosis, Salmonella typhimurium, Pseudomonas aeruginosa). It is also important in autoimmune diseases such as psoriasis, rheumatoid arthritis or spondyloarthropathy.

IL-24's Role in the Jak/STAT Pathway 
IL-24 carries its functions through two types of membrane receptors (IL-22R1/IL-20R2 and IL-20R1/IL-20R2) with simultaneous activation of the  JAK/signal transducer and activator of transcription (STAT) pathway within their cytoplasmic domains. IL-24 is a type of cytokine that interacts frequently with class 2 cytokine receptors. IL-24 can form IL-20R1/IL-20R2 and IL-22R1/IL-20R2 which are shared with the other IL-20SFCs and IL-22. IL-20SFC is an IL-20 subfamily of cytokines which includes IL-19, IL-20, and IL-24. They all signal through the common chain that is IL-20R2. Through these two types of membrane receptors (IL-22R1/IL-20R2 and IL-20R1/IL-20R2), simultaneous activation of the JAK/signal transducer and activator of transcription (STAT) pathway within their cytoplasmic domains.

Although it belongs to the same group of cytokines as IL-10, it has different effect on the immune system. IL-10 is a suppressive cytokine that suppresses inflammation while also maintaining immunomodulatory functions. Beside the normal physiological roles, IL-24 inhibits tumor growth, invasion, metastasis and angiogenesis.

Production of IL-24 by Different Cells 
IL-24 can be produced by myeloid cells (in response to microbial products through TLRs), lymphoid cells, and epithelial cells in response to cytokine stimulation. IL-24 can also dampen the first rounds of CD8 cell expansion to prevent uncontrolled T cell responses. After the combination of anti-IgM and CD40-L stimulation, B lymphocytes can also induce IL-24 expression. In response to immune cells, non-lymphoid cells such as melanocytes can also produce IL-24.

Cancer 
IL-24 is an immunomodulatory cytokine which can also display broad cancer-specific suppressor effects. The tumor suppressor activities of IL-24 include inhibition of angiogenesis, sensitization to chemotherapy, and induction of cancer-specific apoptosis. Given its ubiquitous apoptotic effect on malignant cells, lack of an effect on normal cells, and absence of significant side effects, IL-24 is an important candidate for cancer therapy.

IL-24 is able to induce apoptosis via both intracellular and extracellular signaling mechanisms. Secreted IL-24 protein induces a robust expression of endogenous IL-24 and subsequent induction of tumor-specific killing through an ER stress-mediated pathway as well as by ROS production. The ER stress is the initial pathway in IL-24-induced apoptosis.

An important question, which remained unresolved, is why IL-24 has the abilities to selectively induce apoptosis in a large spectrum of human cancer-derived cell lines without harming normal cells. One possible reason for this differential killing effect involves inherent biochemical differences between normal and cancer cells (ER stress, ROS production and ceramide), another possibility is that IL-24 is able to target a molecule that only triggers apoptosis in cancer cells. The third option for this differential killing effect is that both of the above hypotheses are correct.

IL-24 is able to induce toxic autophagy in cancer cells in vitro and animal models in vivo. Past independent studies have also proven that the cytokine can play a role in inflammation for inflammatory bowel disease, psoriasis, cardiovascular disease, rheumatoid arthritis, tuberculosis, and viral infection.

Secondary cytokines that evoke antitumor immune responses are stimulated by IL-24. These secondary cytokines include TNF-α, IFN-gamma, and IL-1, which induce apoptosis. IL-24 also inhibits cancer by blocking VEGF and TGF-alpha activities through inhibition of Src, a proto-oncogene, within tumor cells and inhibiting epithelial cell differentiation. IL-24 also induces apoptosis By inducing more stress on the endoplasmic reticulum.

References

External links 
 Interleukin24 bibliography of open articles and PubMed search term

Interleukins